Jaco Booysen is a South African former rugby union and rugby league footballer who played in the 1980s, 1990s and 2000s. He played representative rugby league (RL) for South Africa in rugby league at the 1995 Rugby League World Cup and 2000 Rugby League World Cup.

Rugby union career
Booysen made his début for Eastern Transvaal in 1987. He had a brief stint with Northern Transvaal but returned to Eastern Transvaal and later captained the side. When Booysen retired in 2001 after a severe neck injury he had played 132 matches for the Falcons.

Rugby league career
Booysen played for the South African Rhinos 25 times in rugby league. He captained the side at the 1995 World Cup and was also part of the squad at the 2000 World Cup.

In 1996 he spent the season at the Dewsbury Rams, along with several other South African World Cup players. Despite the hype surrounding their arrival, the imports failed to make a lasting impression at the club and returned home the following year.

References

1960s births
Living people
Dewsbury Rams players
Expatriate rugby league players in England
Falcons (rugby union) players
Rugby league props
Rugby union flankers
South Africa national rugby league team captains
South Africa national rugby league team players
South African expatriate rugby league players
South African expatriate sportspeople in England
South African rugby league players
South African rugby union players